Joan Francesc López Casasnovas (13 August 1952 – 19 July 2022) was a Spanish Catalan language philologist, teacher, and politician. He was a member of the Balearic parliament from 1983 to 1992.

References

1952 births
2022 deaths
Politicians from the Balearic Islands
Members of the Parliament of the Balearic Islands
Members of the Institute for Catalan Studies